Robert J. Neu (June 28, 1917 – February 7, 1971) was an American basketball player.  He played four seasons in the American National Basketball League, a forerunner to the modern National Basketball Association.

Neu, who was of German descent, played high school basketball at St. Mel High School in Chicago, Illinois. He then played college basketball for hometown DePaul University, where he was an All-American in his junior and senior seasons.

Following his college career, he played professionally in the NBL.  He spent two seasons with the Hammond Ciesar All-Americans, earning second-team All-NBL honors in 1941.  He then spent three years in the military during World War II.  Upon returning from the service, Neu played two more seasons in the NBL for the Pittsburgh Raiders and Chicago American Gears.  For his NBL career, Neu averaged 6.7 points over 80 games.

References

1917 births
1971 deaths
All-American college men's basketball players
American men's basketball players
United States Army personnel of World War II
American people of German descent
Basketball players from Chicago
Chicago American Gears players
DePaul Blue Demons men's basketball coaches
DePaul Blue Demons men's basketball players
Forwards (basketball)
Guards (basketball)
Hammond Ciesar All-Americans players
Pittsburgh Raiders players
Sportspeople from Chicago